Anton Vladimirovich Demenshchin (born 18 August 1994) is a Russian football player.

Club career
He made his debut in the Russian Football National League for FC Kuban Krasnodar on in a game against FC SKA-Khabarovsk.

References

External links
 
 Profile by Russian Football National League

1994 births
Living people
Russian footballers
Association football forwards
UDA Gramenet footballers
FC Urozhay Krasnodar players
FC Znamya Truda Orekhovo-Zuyevo players
Armenian First League players
Russian First League players
Russian Second League players
Russian expatriate footballers
Expatriate footballers in Italy
Expatriate footballers in Spain
Expatriate footballers in Armenia